John Drinkwater  is the name of:

John Drinkwater Bethune (1762–1844), English officer and military historian
John Drinkwater (playwright) (1882–1937), English poet and dramatist
John Elliot Drinkwater Bethune (1801–1851), pioneer in women's education in India
John Drinkwater (musician, technologist) (born 1957), English composer and technologist